Cheng Lai-king (born 1959 or 1960) is a Hong Kong politician who served as District Councillor for the Castle Road constituency, and as former chairwoman of Central and Western District Council. She is a member of the Democratic Party and a registered social worker.

She had held the seat since its creation in 1994 until her resignation from the District Council in July 2021. Her strongest electoral result was in 2003 when she secured 73.6% (1,625 votes), while in the 2019 elections she held the seat with 51.05% (2,669 votes).

Political career
In July 2019, Cheng criticised the government's crackdown on 12 June 2019, and asked Chief Executive Carrie Lam to resign, retract the government's classification of 12 June protest as a "riot", and set up an independent commission of inquiry. In August, she released a joint statement along with four other Democratic Party district councillors in the Central and Western District. The statement condemned police officers for releasing tear gas in densely populated residential districts without warning, leading to respiratory health concerns.

Cheng was elected chair of the Central and Western District Council for the 2020–23 term during the council's first meeting on 2 January 2020, with fellow Democratic Party councillor Victor Yeung elected as vice-chair.

January 2020 meeting controversy and subsequent harassment
A Central and Western District Council meeting held on 16 January 2020, discussing issues relating to the police force, was attended by Commissioner of Police Chris Tang with a number of plainclothes police officers on standby at the venue. Cheng requested the plainclothes officers to display their warrant cards; one officer who refused to show his warrant card was evicted from the venue.

Cheng subsequently questioned Tang regarding the number of people who had been "raped, sent to China, suicided (被自殺)"; other pro-democracy district councillors also added questions on law enforcement tactics by police during the 2019 protests. A group of pro-government protesters at the venue, including activist , yelled slogans, and clapped after Tang spoke; many of these protesters were expelled by Cheng. Cheng later said on social media that she received an average of four to five unsolicited calls without caller ID between 16 and 17 January, though the callers did not say anything upon her responding.

March 2020 arrest
On 26 March 2020, Hong Kong police arrested Cheng under a sedition law. She was alleged to have shared the identity of a police officer who fired a baton round that blinded a journalist during the 2019–20 Hong Kong protests.

Members of the Democratic Party, including lawmaker Ted Hui, went to bail Cheng out from jail.  When the police requested an unanticipated and unexplained increase in bail money by an additional $5,000 HKD, the party members raised the money in cash immediately outside the police station. Pro-Beijing politician Chan Hok-Fung later uploaded a photo of the scene onto social media, accusing Hui of bribing protesters. The accusation was denied by Sam Yip, a pro-democracy Central and Western District Council member. The Democratic Party later released a statement suggesting that the photo could only have been taken from within the police station, and alleged that the situation was orchestrated by police to slander the party.  Later reports suggested that the Democratic Party filed a complaint with the Independent Police Complaints Council.

On 19 October 2020, Cheng was sentenced to 28 days imprisonment, suspended for 12 months, for civil contempt of court through the sharing of the policeman's identity in contravention of a court injunction.

References

2011 District Council Election Results (Central & Western)
2007 District Council Election Results (Central & Western)
2003 District Council Election Results (Central & Western)
1999 District Council Election Results (Central & Western)

Hong Kong women in politics
Living people
Year of birth missing (living people)
District councillors of Central and Western District
Democratic Party (Hong Kong) politicians